Bánh cuốn (rolled sheets) is a Vietnamese dish originating from Northern Vietnam.

In Vietnamese cuisine 
Bánh cuốn is made from a thin, wide sheet of fermented rice batter filled with a mixture of cooked seasoned ground pork, minced wood ear mushroom, and minced shallots. Sides for this dish usually consist of chả lụa (Vietnamese pork sausage), sliced cucumber, and bean sprouts, with the dipping sauce which is fish sauce called nước chấm (Nuoc Mam).

The rice sheet in bánh cuốn is extremely thin and delicate. It is made by steaming a slightly fermented rice batter on a cloth that is stretched over a pot of boiling water. It is a light dish, and is generally eaten for breakfast everywhere in Vietnam. A different version of bánh cuốn, called bánh cuốn Thanh Trì and bánh cuốn làng Kênh, may be found in Thanh Trì, a southern district of Hanoi and Kênh village of Nam Định, an ancient village in the centre of Nam Định city. Bánh cuốn Thanh Trì or Bánh cuốn làng Kênh are not rolls, but just rice sheets eaten with chả lụa, fried shallots, or prawns.

Bánh ướt is simply the unfilled rice sheet, and is typically served with bean sprouts, chopped lettuce, sliced cucumber, fresh basil and mint, fried shallots and onions, cha/gio lua, and nuoc mam.

In other countries
In regards to Vietnamese culture, Thai cuisine commonly refers to the dish as pak moh yuan. Skilled food preparers will make each rice sheet extra thin with as much stuffing as possible. Rice sheets are usually made of arrowroot flour which gives tapioca-like consistency. The dough may also be infused with naturally extracted herbs such as butterfly pea for blue shades and pandan for green shades. As for the stuffing, the most popular stuffing is ground pork with cilantro roots, pepper, garlic, shallots and preserved radish. Less common stuffing is chicken, mushroom, corn, coconut, bean sprouts, chives, etc. Vegetarian recipes are also available.

Pak moh yuan is often served with sauces and toppings. While sweet chili sauce is the standard, recipes from certain regions may also use seafood ingredients in their sauce. Coconut milk may be drizzled on top as a sweet option. The dish may be garnished with fried garlic and served with lettuce and fresh chili on the side.

Other variation known in Thai cuisine is khao phan (lit. "rice wrap"). It is regarded a speciality of Uttaradit province where it is eaten freshly made in many variations, but also sun-dried. The dried versions often have spices added to them and are popularly used as a wrap for a spicy salad made with rice noodle and minced pork.

Gallery

Bánh ướt
Bánh ướt, is a Vietnamese thin pancake wrapper consisting of rice noodle sheets, eaten with nước chấm, fried shallots, and a side of chả lụa (Vietnamese pork sausage).

See also

References

comment faire Banh Cuon
Plats Banh Cuon

External links

 Alice's Guide to Vietnamese Banh
 Bánh cuốn on Hanoidelicious

Vietnamese rice dishes
Thai cuisine
Steamed foods
Fermented foods
Vietnamese noodle dishes
Rice flour dishes
Bánh
Stuffed dishes